Stefan Ptaszek (born April 15, 1971) is the head coach for the McMaster Marauders. He is a former Canadian football wide receiver and former offensive coordinator for the Hamilton Tiger-Cats, Wilfrid Laurier Golden Hawks, and UBC Thunderbirds.

Playing career

Collegiately, Ptaszek played CIAU football for the Wilfrid Laurier Golden Hawks. He was named an all-Canadian three times and was part of the 1991 Yates Cup and 27th Vanier Cup championship team. Ptaszek was also named to the Golden Hawks Team of the Century and holds the school's records for most receiving yards in a career.  As a professional player, he played for four seasons for the BC Lions, Hamilton Tiger-Cats, and Toronto Argonauts of the Canadian Football League.

Coaching career

Wilfrid Laurier Golden Hawks

Ptaszek served as the offensive coordinator for the Wilfrid Laurier Golden Hawks for three seasons. During that time, he helped his team to win back to back Yates Cups in 2004 and 2005 and the 41st Vanier Cup.

McMaster Marauders

Ptaszek became McMaster's head coach in 2006 and won the school's first Vanier Cup championship in 2011. Ptaszek also coached the Marauders to the longest winning streak in CIS history, winning 21 games in a row spanning over the 2011 and 2012 seasons. In 2012, he was named the CIS Coach of the Year.

Hamilton Tiger-Cats

On May 5, 2016, Ptaszek was named the offensive coordinator and receivers coach for the Canadian Football League's Hamilton Tiger-Cats.

UBC Thunderbirds

Ptaszek served as the offensive coordinator for the UBC Thunderbirds for the 2018 season.

Return to the McMaster Marauders

On November 28, 2018, Ptaszek was named head coach of the McMaster Marauders. During his first season back, the Marauders finished the 2019 regular season with a record of 6-2, en route to winning the Yates Cup.

References

External links
McMaster profile

1971 births
BC Lions players
Canadian football wide receivers
Hamilton Tiger-Cats players
Living people
Players of Canadian football from Ontario
Sportspeople from Burlington, Ontario
Toronto Argonauts players
Wilfrid Laurier Golden Hawks football players
McMaster Marauders football coaches
Hamilton Tiger-Cats coaches
Wilfrid Laurier Golden Hawks football coaches
UBC Thunderbirds football coaches